"Milliondollar$mile" is a song by Swiss rapper Loredana.

Composition and reception 

With a length of two minutes and 54 seconds, "Milliondollar$mile" was independently released as a single for digital download and streaming in various countries on 7 December 2018. The single was written by Loredana and German producers Macloud (Laurin Auth) and Miksu (Joshua Allery), with the production handled by the latter two. It was written mostly in German, though a few lyrics are in Albanian. Austrian website Red Bull lauded the Albanian lyrics as well as the single's cover art. Laura Leuenberger from Swiss broadcaster SRF wrote that Loredana delivers autotune with "attitude"  confidently spitting over the sound.

Music video 

The accompanying music video for "Milliondollar$mile" was uploaded to Loredana's official YouTube channel on 7 December 2018, simultaneously with the single's release. Produced by Orkan Çe, it was filmed at the annual Lozerner Määs fair in the city of Lucerne, Switzerland, and features the guest appearance from then-husband and Kosovo-Albanian rapper Mozzik. According to Red Bull, it may be concluded that American rapper 50 Cent and group G-Unit was once important to Loredana.

Credits and personnel 

Credits adapted from Spotify and YouTube.

Loredanaperforming, vocals, songwriting
Macloud (Laurin Auth)composition, production
Miksu (Joshua Allery)composition, production
Orkan Çevideo production

Track listing 

Digital download
"Milliondollar$mile"2:54

Charts

Release history

References 

2018 singles
2018 songs
Loredana Zefi songs
German-language songs
Song recordings produced by Macloud
Song recordings produced by Miksu
Songs written by Loredana Zefi